Urban art combines street art and graffiti and is often used to summarize all visual art forms arising in urban areas, being inspired by urban architecture or present urban lifestyle. Because the urban arts are characterized by existing in the public space, they are often viewed as vandalism and destruction of private property.

Although urban art started at the neighborhood level, where many people of different cultures live together, it is an international art form with an unlimited number of uses nowadays. Many urban artists travel from city to city and have social contacts all over the world. The notion of 'Urban Art' developed from street art which is primarily concerned with graffiti culture. Urban art represents a broader cross-section of artists that, in addition to covering traditional street artists working in formal gallery spaces, also cover artists using more traditional media but with a subject matter that deals with contemporary urban culture and political issues. In Paris, Le Mur is a public museum of urban art.

In the mainstream 
Though starting as an underground movement, urban artists like Banksy and Adam Neate have now gained mainstream status and have, in turn, propelled the urban art scene into popular culture. Perceptions have started to change as urban movements such as graffiti slowly gain acceptance from the public. A confirmation of street art's new mainstream status can be, in part, confirmed by an invitation from the Tate calling upon artists to create outdoor pieces on the Thames side of the gallery in the summer of 2008.

The band Gorillaz uses an urban art style to promote their band. The band members are animated in a graffiti style.

Notable street artists

Notable urban artists not primarily associated with street art
Eberhard Bosslet
Tom Christopher
Guy Denning
Burhan Dogancay
Nick Gentry 
Dave Kinsey
Antony Micallef
Jonathan Yeo

See also
Urban art biennial
Urban culture
Art graffiti
MONU - magazine on urbanism
Urban Interventionism

Urban art in Europe

Spain 
In Spain, urban art, influenced by graffiti art and urban art from New York, was born first in the peripheral neighborhoods of large cities and in the towns of their metropolitan areas and then spread throughout the rest of the country. Currently Valencia, Madrid, Barcelona, Pontevedra, Zaragoza and Cuenca are important focuses of this discipline. The Aragonese city is a benchmark thanks to its Asalto urban culture festival, 5 which brings together artists from all over the world and performs interventions in the city. It is worth highlighting the rural city of La Bañeza, which has become the European city with the most works per square meter built.

References

Further reading
 Le Bijoutier (2008), This Means Nothing, Powerhouse Books, 
 Bou, Louis (2006), NYC BCN: Street Art Revolution, HarperCollins, 
 Bou, Louis (2005), Street Art: Graffiti, stencils, stickers & logos, Instituto Monsa de ediciones, S.A., 
 
 Combs, Dave and Holly (2008), PEEL: The Art of the Sticker, Mark Batty Publisher, 
 Fairey, Shepard (2008), Obey: E Pluribus Venom: The Art of Shepard Fairey, Gingko Press, 
 Fairey, Shepard (2009), Obey: Supply & Demand, The Art of Shepard Fairey, Gingko Press, 
 Gavin, Francesca (2007), Street Renegades: New Underground Art, Laurence King Publishers, 
 Goldstein, Jerry (2008), Athens Street Art, Athens: Athens News, 
 Harrington, Steven P. and Rojo, Jaime (2008), Brooklyn Street Art, Prestel, 
 Harrington, Steven P. and Rojo, Jaime (2010), Street Art New York, Prestel, 
 Hundertmark, Christian (2005), The Art Of Rebellion: The World Of Street Art, Gingko Press, 
 Hundertmark, Christian (2006), The Art Of Rebellion 2: World of Urban Art Activism, Gingko Press, 
 Jakob, Kai (2009), Street Art in Berlin, Jaron, 
 Lewisohn, Cedar (2008), Street Art: The Graffiti Revolution, London, England: Tate Publishing, 
 Longhi, Samantha (2007), Stencil History X, Association C215, 
 Manco, Tristan (2002), Stencil Graffiti, Thames and Hudson, 
 Manco, Tristan (2004), Street Logos, Thames and Hudson, 
 Marziani, Gianluca (2009), Scala Mercalli: The Creative Earthquake of Italian Street Art, Drago Publishing, 
 Palmer, Rod (2008), Street Art Chile, Eight Books, 
 Schwartzman, Allan (1985), Street Art, The Dial Press, 
 Strike, Christian and Rose, Aaron (Aug 2005), Beautiful Losers: Contemporary Art and Street Culture, Distributed Art Publishers, 
 Walde, Claudia (2007), Sticker City: Paper Graffiti Art (Street Graphics / Street Art Series), Thames & Hudson, 
 Williams, Sarah Jaye, ed. (2008), Philosophy of Obey (Obey Giant): The Formative Years (1989–2008), Nerve Books UK.
 Walde, Claudia (2011), Street Fonts - Graffiti Alphabets From Around The World, Thames & Hudson,

External links
 Urban Art Now at Google Cultural Institute

Visual arts genres
Urban culture
Street art